Paolo Duca (born 3 June 1981 in Ascona) is a Swiss former professional ice hockey player who played for HC Ambrì-Piotta, ZSC Lions and EV Zug in the National League (NL), appearing in a total of 895 NL contests.

Playing career
He participated in the 2010 IIHF World Championship as a member of the Switzerland men's national ice hockey team.

Duca put an end to his playing career in April 2017 and took over as sporting director of HC Ambrì-Piotta.

References

External links

1981 births
Living people
HC Ambrì-Piotta players
People from Ascona
GCK Lions players
Swiss ice hockey forwards
ZSC Lions players
EV Zug players
Sportspeople from Ticino